Andapa District is a district in northern Madagascar. It is a part of Sava Region and borders the districts of Ambilobe and Sambava to the north, Antalaha to the east, Maroantsetra to the south, and Befandriana Nord and Bealanana to the west.

Communes
The district is further divided into 17 communes:

 Ambalamanasy II
 Ambodiangezoka
 Ambodimanga, Andapa
 Andapa
 Andrakata
 Andranomena
 Anjialava Be
 Ankiaka Be Nord
 Anoviara
 Antsahamena
 Bealampona
 Belaoka Marovato
 Betsakotsako Andranotsara
 Doany
 Marovato, Andapa
 Matsohely
 Tanandava, Andapa

References and notes

Districts of Sava Region